Lisa P. Tomasso (born July 27, 1970) is an American politician and a Democratic former member of the Rhode Island House of Representatives representing District 29 from January 2011 to January 2015.

Education
Tomasso earned her BA in political science from the University of Rhode Island.

Elections
2010 When District 29 Republican Representative Raymond Sullivan left the Legislature and left the seat open, Tomasso ran in the September 23, 2010 Democratic Primary, winning with 632 votes (65.8%) and won the November 2, 2010 General election by 8 votes with 2,739 votes (50.1%) against Republican nominee Gregory Coutcher.
2012 Tomasso was unopposed for the September 11, 2012 Democratic Primary, winning with 687 votes and won the November 6, 2012 General election with 3,973 votes (58.4%) against Republican nominee Keith Anderson.
2014 Tomasso was unopposed for the September 9, 2014 Democratic Primary, winning with 1081 votes and lost the November 4, 2014 General election with 2,558 votes (47.6%) against Republican nominee Sherry Roberts.

References

External links

Lisa Tomasso at Ballotpedia
Lisa P. Tomasso at the National Institute on Money in State Politics

Place of birth missing (living people)
1970 births
Living people
Democratic Party members of the Rhode Island House of Representatives
People from Coventry, Rhode Island
University of Rhode Island alumni
Women state legislators in Rhode Island
21st-century American women